15 mil dibujos ("15 Thousand Drawings") is a 1942 Chilean animated film of 35 millimeters made by the filmmakers Juan Carlos Trupp and Jaime Escudero Sanhueza. It was filmed by Enrique Soto, and its music was performed by Chilean band Los Huasos Quincheros. 15 mil dibujos is the third animated film made in Chile, after Transmisión del mando presidencial (1921) and Vida y milagros de Don Fausto (1924).

Plot 
The story recounts the adventures of the condor anthropomorphous, Copuchita (whose name comes of the Chilean term "Copucha"), and his friends, the cougar dressed as a mapuche Manihuel, the rooster dressed as a huaso Ño Benhaiga, and a young woman named Clarita.

Production 
In 1930s, Juan Carlos Trupp met Jaime Escudero Sanhueza at the Arquitecture of Pontifical Catholic University of Chile. Both Trupp and Escudero began the realization of this short in an artisanal way, taking place in a workshop located on the corner of the street Lira & Marcoleta in Santiago de Chile. The film received financial help from friends and family of directors Trupp and Escudero. Trupp's grandmother, Leopoldina, composed the music of the film; however, it was performed by Chilean band Los Huasos Quincheros. Enrique Soto was in charge of filming. Later, Trupp and Escudero won the financial support of CORFO and the Compañía de Salitres de Chile (COSACH), where Escudero's father worked, who was a lawyer and also financially supported the project.

According to Escudero, in an interview with Museo de la Historieta de Chile (Chilean Cartoon Museum), the central idea of the film was born out of his interest in dignifying the Chilean roto, and a large part of the characters were designed based on this concept, which was the main reason why Copuchita, the main character of the film, wears a typical hat of a Roto. "I am already 87 years old, so I apologize for forgetting some things," says Escudero; however, Escudero was certain that it was a feature-length film, since scenes filmed with actors in Chilean films were used to extend its footage. Despite the great efforts of Escudero and Trupp, the movie went unfinished for a long time, which caused a drop in mood, especially from family members, since the monetary demand was very high. According to the website Cine Chile, "it was absolutely nothing comparable to the monumental works that Disney produced in those days."

In September 1941, Walt Disney, made a visit to Chile with the aim of finishing one of the parts of the 42-minute film Saludos Amigos. In addition, he visited La Moneda, met with the most illustrious cartoonists of Topaze magazine, and visited the workshop of Lira & Marcoleta in which Trupp and Escudero worked. Disney watched the movie progress and he supported and advised them to do their work more efficiently, since they used hitherto basic and handmade materials. To see the effort put into the film's production, Disney invited the filmmakers to work with him in the United States, but this was never fulfilled due to the tense situation in the North American country during World War II. Although Escudero was the cartoonist, he recognized that the presence of Carlos Trupp was what helped him to continue with the project; according to Escudero, Carlos Trupp was a fairly hyperkinetic young man. Escudero did not hesitate to consider that the film "was not good"; against this, Victor Uribe pointed out that "Don Escudero detracts from his own work" and affirmed that "the value of this material as a historical document is invaluable".

Reception 
15 mil dibujos was premiered in a Santiago room on December 24, 1942, and it was also released in the Imperio and Miami theaters. After a week of its publication, the film was a box office flop, and the criticisms from the Ecran magazine on December 29, 1942 were mainly negatives. According to the magazine, 15 mil dibujos has "an endless series of defects" and stated that the plot is "almost childish", adding that the drawings "are weak" and that "harmony in their movements" was lacking. Regarding the characters, I comment that although they are "ingenious" they are "too grotesque". He also added that «the intervention of the group of "Los Quinchineros" gives the film amenity.»

In addition, the creators, unable to collect the money invested, were indebted to the cinemas that showed it. On November 5, 1947, Carlos Trupp directed the 30 minute documentary, Santiago de Cuatro Siglos, a Black and white film of 35 millimeters, that tells the history of the city. It was scripted by Orlando Cabrera Leiva, filmed by Luis Bernal and sponsored by the Municipality of Las Condes. Escudero later worked in other areas: either working in magazines like El Cabrito and El Peneca, or creating the logos of the stations in the 1980s.

Restoration attempts 
About 2 years before 2001, Rodrigo Trupp, a Carlos Trupp's grandson, came across at their house located in Chicago, US a chest what contained a old copy of the tape. Later he try to restore the tape 15 mil dibujos, however, this idea never came to fruition. Later, the Trupp's grandson along with Victor Uribe joined forces to go in search of lost pieces of the film and money to complete the project. Uribe asked for a total of $1 million explaining that: "My idea is to transfer this material from film to video and make a short film", however they did not continue with the project.

Conservation status 
Kylie Trupp, a Trupp's granddaughter and student at the University of the Americas, began a search to try to rediscover all the material that had been left over of the tape, in this way, he obtained a trunk containing rolls of the film 15 mil dibujos. According to the Chilean magazine El Mercurio, Kylie reported this discovery to the teachers of the university, who were in charge of the restoration and digitization of the work together with the Cineteca Nacional. While was not achieved to discover all the material of the tape, the little material that Kylie Trupp could find, her present it at the 2014 Noche de Monos Festival of UDLA, and later uploaded to their YouTube account.

In other media 
In 1960, 15 mil dibujos scenes were used in the documentary Recordando by Edmundo Urrutia. In 1962, during the production of the unreleased film Condorito en el Circo, Ecran magazine published an article about the movie and rumored that Copuchita could be Condorito's father. In an interview with Escudero with Ergocomics he pointed out that "the character Copuchita is from 1941 and Condorito appeared in "Okey" in 1949, so it must be one of the inspirations of Condorito, since Pepo met him and at some point talked about him, but nothing that can be proven, in any case it is an honor if it was so". In June 2017, an exhibition of 200 images called Del Condor al Oso: 75 años de animació chilena was held at the Gabriela Mistral Cultural Center (GAM), starting with 15 mil dibujos and ending with Historia de un Oso.

References

External links 
 15 mil dibujos (1942) at FilmAffinity.
 Copuchita by lemonkylie.

Chilean animated short films
Chilean black-and-white films
1942 films
1942 animated films